Palmer Creek may refer to:

 Palmer Creek (Turnagain Arm), Alaska, US
 Palmer Creek (Georgia)
 Palmer Creek (Minnesota)
 Palmer Creek (Big Creek tributary), a stream in Missouri
 Palmer Creek (New York)
 Palmer Creek (Applegate River tributary), Oregon, US
 Palmer Creek (Yamhill River tributary), Oregon, US